The 20th General Assembly of Nova Scotia represented Nova Scotia between 1855 and 1859.

The assembly sat at the pleasure of the Governor of Nova Scotia, John Le Marchant. George Phipps, Viscount Normanby, became governor in 1858.

Stewart Campbell was chosen as speaker for the house.

List of Members 

Notes:

References 
Journal and proceedings of the House of Assembly, Session 1856 (1856)

Terms of the General Assembly of Nova Scotia
1855 in Canada
1856 in Canada
1857 in Canada
1858 in Canada
1859 in Canada
1855 establishments in Nova Scotia
1859 disestablishments in Nova Scotia